

Events

January 

 January 1
 The British colonies of New South Wales, Queensland, South Australia, Tasmania, Victoria and Western Australia federate as the Commonwealth of Australia; Edmund Barton becomes the first Prime Minister of Australia.
 Nigeria becomes a British protectorate.
 January 9 – Lord Kitchener reports that Christiaan de Wet has shot one of the "peace" envoys, and flogged two more, who had gone to his commando to ask the Burgher citizens of South Africa to halt fighting.
 January 22 – Queen Victoria of the United Kingdom dies at Osborne House on the Isle of Wight. She is 81 years old and has served as monarch for nearly 64 years – longer than any other British monarch in history up to this date. Her eldest son, The Prince Albert Edward, "Bertie", the longest-serving Prince of Wales to this time, succeeds his mother at the age of 59, reigning as King Edward VII, and also becoming Emperor of India.

February 

 February 2 – The State funeral of Queen Victoria, held at St George's Chapel, Windsor Castle, UK, is attended by many European royals, including Kaiser Wilhelm II and Archduke Franz Ferdinand of Austria.
 February 5 – The Hay–Pauncefote Treaty is signed by the United Kingdom and United States, ceding control of the Panama Canal to the United States.
 February 12 – Viceroy of India Lord Curzon creates the new North-West Frontier Province in the north of the Punjab region, bordering Afghanistan.
 February 14 – Edward VII opens his first parliament of the United Kingdom.
 February 16 – Bulgaria: Macedonian demonstrators in Sofia demand independence from Turkey.
 February 20 – The Hawaii Territory Legislature convenes for the first time.
 February 22 – The Pacific Mail Steamship Company's  sinks entering San Francisco Bay, killing 128.
 February 23 – The United Kingdom and Germany agree on the frontier between German East Africa and the British colony of Nyasaland.
 February 25 – U.S. Steel is incorporated by industrialist J. P. Morgan, as the first billion-dollar corporation.
 February 26
 Chi-hsui and Hsu-cheng-yu, Boxer Rebellion leaders, are executed in Peking.
 The Middelburg peace conference fails in South Africa, as Boers continue to demand autonomy.
 February 27 – The Sultan of Turkey orders 50,000 troops to the Bulgarian frontier because of unrest in Macedonia.

March–April 

 March 1
 The United Kingdom, Germany and Japan protest the Sino-Russian agreement on Manchuria.
 The 1901 Census of India is taken, the fourth, and first reliable, census of the British Raj.
 March 2 – The United States Congress passes the Platt Amendment, limiting the autonomy of Cuba as a condition for the withdrawal of American troops.
 March 4 – Second inauguration of William McKinley as President of the United States.
 March 5 – Irish nationalist demonstrators are ejected by police from the House of Commons of the United Kingdom in London.
 March 6 – In Bremen, an assassination attempt is made on Wilhelm II, German Emperor.
 March 11 – The United Kingdom rejects the amended Hay–Pauncefote Treaty.
 March 17 – A showing of 71 Vincent van Gogh paintings in Paris, 10 years after his death, creates a sensation.
 March 31
 A 7.2  Black Sea earthquake occurs off the northeast coast of Bulgaria, with a maximum intensity of X (Extreme). A destructive tsunami affects the province of Dobrich.
 The United Kingdom Census 1901 is taken. The number of people employed in manufacturing is at its highest-ever level.

April 
 April 29 – Anti-Jewish rioting breaks out in Budapest.

May 

 May 5 – The Caste War of Yucatán in Mexico officially ends, although Mayan skirmishers continue sporadic fighting for another decade.
 May 9 – The first Australian Parliament opens in Melbourne.
 May 17 – Panic of 1901: The New York Stock Exchange crashes.
 May 24 – 81 miners are killed in an accident at Universal Colliery, Senghenydd in South Wales.
 May 25 – The Club Atlético River Plate is founded in Argentina.
 May 27 – In New Jersey, the Edison Storage Battery Company is founded.
 May 28 – D'Arcy Concession: Mozaffar ad-Din Shah Qajar of Persia grants British businessman William Knox D'Arcy a concession giving him an exclusive right to prospect for oil.

June

 June 2 – Katsura Tarō becomes Prime Minister of Japan.
 June 12 – Cuba becomes a United States protectorate.
 June 15 –  is the first Cunard Line ship to receive a wireless radio set.
 June 18 – British peace campaigner Emily Hobhouse reports on the high mortality and cruel conditions in the Second Boer War concentration camps
 June 24 – Paris sees first Picassos: the young Spanish artist exhibits his work at Ambroise Vollard's gallery for the first time.

July–August 

 July 1 – The first United Kingdom Fingerprint Bureau is established at Scotland Yard, the Metropolitan Police headquarters in London, by Edward Henry.
 July 4
 The 1,282 foot (390 m) covered bridge crossing the Saint John River at Hartland, New Brunswick, Canada opens. It is the longest covered bridge in the world.
 William Howard Taft becomes Governor-General of the Philippines.
 July 10 – The world's first passenger-carrying trolleybus in regular service operates on the Biela Valley Trolleybus route at Königstein, Germany.
 August 5 – Peter O'Connor sets the first International Association of Athletics Federations recognised long jump world record, of 24 ft 11¾ ins (7.61m). The record will stand for 20 years.
 August 6 – Discovery Expedition: Robert Falcon Scott sets sail from Britain on the RRS Discovery to explore the Ross Sea in Antarctica.
 August 14 – The first claimed powered flight is made, by German-born American aviator Gustave Whitehead, in his Number 21, in Connecticut.
 August 21 – The International Secretariat of National Trade Union Centres is founded in Copenhagen.
 August 28 – Silliman University is founded in the Philippines, the first American private school in the country.
 August 30 – Hubert Cecil Booth patents an electric vacuum cleaner, in the United Kingdom.

September 

 September 5 – The National Association of Professional Baseball Leagues (later renamed Minor League Baseball), is formed in Chicago.
 September 6 – William McKinley assassination: American anarchist Leon Czolgosz shoots U.S. President William McKinley at the Pan-American Exposition in Buffalo, New York. McKinley dies 8 days later.
 September 7 – The Boxer Rebellion in Qing dynasty China officially ends, with the signing of the Boxer Protocol.
 September 14 – Vice President Theodore Roosevelt becomes the 26th president of the United States, upon President William McKinley's death. Roosevelt is sworn in this afternoon.
 September 28 – Philippine–American War: Balangiga massacre: Filipino guerrillas kill more than forty United States soldiers in a surprise attack in the town of Balangiga.

October 

 October 2 – The British Royal Navy's first submarine, Holland 1, is launched at Barrow-in-Furness.
 October 4 – The American yacht Columbia defeats the British Shamrock in the America's Cup yachting race.
 October 16 – U.S. President Theodore Roosevelt invites African American leader Booker T. Washington to the White House. The American South reacts angrily to the visit, and racial violence increases in the region.
 October 23 – Yale University celebrates its bicentennial.
 October 24 – Michigan schoolteacher Annie Edson Taylor goes over Niagara Falls in a barrel and survives.
 October 29 
Leon Czolgosz is executed for assassinating William McKinley in Buffalo, New York on September 6.
In Amherst, New York, nurse Jane Toppan is arrested for murdering the Davis family of Boston with an overdose of morphine.

November 

 November 1 – The Sigma Phi Epsilon college fraternity is founded in Richmond, Virginia.
 November 9 – The Prince George, Duke of Cornwall (later George V of the United Kingdom) becomes Prince of Wales and Earl of Chester.
November 13 – 1901 Caister lifeboat disaster: a life-boat capsizes on service on the east coast of England during a great storm; nine of the twelve crew on board are killed. This gives ride to the lifeboatmen's motto "Never turn back."
 November 15 – The Alpha Sigma Alpha fraternity is founded at Longwood University in Farmville, Virginia.
 November 25 – Auguste Deter is first examined by German psychiatrist Dr. Alois Alzheimer, leading to a diagnosis of the condition that will carry Alzheimer's name.
 November 28 – The new Constitution of Alabama requires voters in the state to have passed literacy tests.

December 

 December 3
 U.S. President Theodore Roosevelt delivers a 20,000-word speech to the United States House of Representatives asking Congress to curb the power of trusts "within reasonable limits".
 The Immigration Restriction Act 1901 is passed by the new Parliament of Australia as the basis of a White Australia policy. It is given royal assent on December 23.
 December 10 – The first Nobel Prize ceremony is held in Stockholm, on the fifth anniversary of Alfred Nobel's death.
 December 12 – Guglielmo Marconi receives the first trans-Atlantic radio signal, sent from Poldhu, England, to St. John's, Newfoundland; it is the letter "S" in Morse code.
 December 20 – The final spike is driven into the Mombasa–Victoria–Uganda Railway, in modern-day Kisumu, Kenya.
 December 22 – Charles Aked, a Baptist minister in Liverpool, says about the war in South Africa: "Great Britain cannot win the battles without resorting to the last despicable cowardice of the most loathsome cur on earth — the act of striking a brave man's heart through his wife's honour and his child's life. The cowardly war has been conducted by methods of barbarism... the concentration camps have been Murder Camps." A crowd follows him home and breaks the windows of his house.

Date unknown 
 The okapi is observed for the first time by Europeans (previously known only to African natives).
 New Zealand inventor Ernest Godward invents the spiral hairpin.
 American businessman William S. Harley draws up plans for his first prototype motorcycle.
 German Oscar Troplowitz invents for German company Beiersdorf the medical plaster patch called "Leukoplast".
 German engineer Richard Fiedler invents the modern Flamethrower, the Kleinflammenwerfer.
 AB Lux, as the predecessor of Electrolux, founded in Sweden.
 American retail pharmacy Walgreens is founded in Chicago.
 The Intercollegiate Prohibition Association is established in Chicago.
 The Bulgarian Women's Union is founded.
 Splošno slovensko žensko društvo , the first women's organisation in Slovenia, is founded.

Births

January 

 January 1 – George Karslidis, Greek Orthodox priest, elder and saint (d. 1959)
 January 2 – Lew Landers, American director (d. 1962)
 January 3 – Ngô Đình Diệm, 1st president of South Vietnam (d. 1963)
 January 4
 Salvatore Dell'Isola, Italian conductor (d. 1989)
 C. L. R. James, Trinidad-born writer, journalist (d. 1989)
 January 7 – Teodora Fracasso, Italian Roman Catholic religious professed (d. 1927)
 January 9
 Chic Young, American cartoonist (d. 1973)
 Vilma Bánky, Hungarian-born American actress (d. 1991)
 January 10 – Henning von Tresckow, German Wehrmacht Major General (d. 1944)
 January 11 – Kwon Ki-ok, Korean pilot (d. 1988)
 January 13
 A. B. Guthrie, American novelist and historian (d. 1991)
 Mieczysław Żywczyński, Polish historian, priest (d. 1978)
 Wilhelm Hanle, German physicist (d. 1993)
 January 14
 Bebe Daniels, American actress (d. 1971)
 Alfred Tarski, Polish logician and mathematician (d. 1983)
 January 16
 Fulgencio Batista, Cuban leader (d. 1973)
 Frank Zamboni, American inventor (d. 1988)
 January 17 – Susana Calandrelli, Argentine writer and teacher (d. 1978)
 January 21 – Marcellus Boss, American politician, lawyer, member of Kansas Senate and 5th Civilian Governor of Guam (d. 1967)
 January 22 – Alberto Hurtado, Chilean Jesuit priest and saint (d. 1952)
 January 24
 Hans Erich Apostel, Austrian composer (d. 1972)
 Harry Calder, South African cricketer (d. 1995)
 January 25 – Mildred Dunnock, American actress (d. 1991) 
 January 27 – Art Rooney, American football team owner (d. 1988)
 January 29 – E. P. Taylor, Canadian business tycoon (d. 1989)
 January 30
 Samir Al-Rifai, 9th Prime Minister of Jordan (d. 1965)
 Rudolf Caracciola, German race car driver (d. 1959)

February 

 February 1
 Frank Buckles, last surviving American veteran of World War I (d. 2011)
 Clark Gable, American actor (d. 1960)
 February 2 – Jascha Heifetz, Lithuanian violinist (d. 1987)
 February 3 – Arvid Wallman, Swedish diver (d. 1982)
 February 6 – Pat Harrington Sr., Canadian actor (d. 1965)
 February 9 – Brian Donlevy, American actor (d. 1972)
 February 10
 Stella Adler, American actress, acting teacher (d. 1992)
 Anthony Prusinski, American politician (d. 1950)
 February 15
 João Branco Núncio, Portuguese bullfighter (d. 1976)
 Kenneth Callow, British biochemist (d. 1983)
 February 16 – Chester Morris, American actor (d. 1970)
 February 19 – Florence Green, British Royal Air Force member, last surviving World War I veteran (d. 2012)
 February 20 – Mohammed Naguib, 30th Prime Minister of Egypt and 1st President of Egypt (d. 1984)
 February 22
Mildred Davis, American actress (d. 1969)
Charles Evans Whittaker, Associate Justice of the Supreme Court of the United States (d. 1973)
 February 23 – Ivar Lo-Johansson, Swedish writer (d. 1990)
 February 25 – Zeppo Marx, American comedian (d. 1979)
 February 27 – Horatio Luro, Argentine horse trainer (d. 1991)
 February 28 – Linus Pauling, American chemist, recipient of the Nobel Prize in Chemistry and Peace (d. 1994)

March 

 March 3 – Claude Choules, British World War I veteran, last surviving combat veteran from any nation (d. 2011)
 March 4
 Charles Goren, American bridge player (d. 1991)
 Jean-Joseph Rabearivelo, Malagasy-French poet (d. 1937)
 March 9 – Joachim Hämmerling, German-Danish biologist (d. 1980)
 March 13 – Paul Fix, American actor (d. 1983)
 March 17 – Alfred Newman, American film composer (d. 1970)
 Ludolf von Alvensleben, German Nazi functionary, SS and Police Leader (d. 1970)
 March 21
 Karl Arnold, German politician (d. 1958)
 Carmelita Geraghty, American actress (d. 1966)
 March 22 – Greta Kempton, American artist (d. 1991)
 March 23 – Bon Maharaja, Indian guru, religious writer (d. 1982)
 March 24 – Ub Iwerks, American cartoonist (d. 1971)
 March 25 – Ed Begley, American actor (d. 1970)
 March 26 – Teresa Demjanovich, American Roman Catholic religious professed and blessed (d. 1927)
 March 27
 Carl Barks, American cartoonist, screenwriter (d. 2000)
 Erich Ollenhauer, German politician (d. 1963)
 Enrique Santos Discépolo, Argentine tango, milonga musician and composer (d. 1951)
 Eisaku Satō, Prime Minister of Japan, recipient of the Nobel Peace Prize (d. 1975)
 Kenneth Slessor, Australian poet (d. 1971)
 March 28 – Jack Weil, American entrepreneur (d. 2008)

April 

 April 1 – Whittaker Chambers, American spy (d. 1961)
 April 5 – Melvyn Douglas, American actor (d. 1981)
 April 13 – Jacques Lacan, French psychoanalyst, psychiatrist (d. 1981)
 April 15
 Joe Davis, English snooker, billiards player (d. 1978)
 Ajoy Mukherjee, Indian politician, Chief Minister of West Bengal (d. 1986)
 René Pleven, Prime Minister of France (d. 1993)
 April 16 – Lajos Dinnyés, 41st prime minister of Hungary (d. 1961)
 April 18 – Al Lewis, American songwriter (d. 1967)
 April 19 – Kiyoshi Oka, Japanese mathematician (d. 1978)
 April 29 – Hirohito, Emperor of Japan (d. 1989)
 April 30 – Simon Kuznets, Ukrainian-born economist, Nobel Prize laureate (d. 1985)

May 

 May 3 – Gino Cervi, Italian actor (d. 1974)
 May 7 – Gary Cooper, American actor (d. 1961)
 May 11 – Rose Ausländer, German poet (d. 1988)
 May 13 – Witold Pilecki, Polish resistance leader (executed 1948)
 May 17
 Werner Egk, German composer (d. 1983)
 Max Lorenz, German tenor (d. 1975)
 May 18 – Vincent du Vigneaud, American chemist, Nobel Prize laureate (d. 1978) 
 May 20 – Max Euwe, Dutch chess player (d. 1981)
 May 21
 Manfred Aschner, German-born Israeli microbiologist, entomologist and recipient of the Israel Prize (d. 1989).
 Horace Heidt, American bandleader (d. 1986)
 Sam Jaffe, American film producer (d. 2000)
 Suzanne Lilar, Belgian essayist, novelist and playwright (d. 1992)
 May 24 – Gustav Åkerman, Swedish army officer (d. 1988)
 May 25 – Antônio de Alcântara Machado, Brazilian novelist (d. 1935)
 May 31 – Alfredo Antonini, American conductor, composer (d. 1983)

June 

 June 3 – Zhang Xueliang, Chinese military leader (d. 2001)
 June 6 – Sukarno, 1st president of Indonesia (d. 1970)
 June 7 – Hugo Ballivián , Bolivian military officer, 44th President of Bolivia (d. 1993)
 June 12 – Arnold Kirkeby, American hotelier, art collector, and real estate investor (d. 1962)
 June 13
Tage Erlander, Swedish politician (social democrat), prime minister of Sweden for 23 years (1946–1969) (d. 1985)
Jean Prévost, French writer, journalist and member of the Maquis (d. 1944)
 June 16 – Henri Lefebvre, French Marxist philosopher, sociologist (d. 1991)
 June 17 – F. F. E. Yeo-Thomas, English World War II hero (d. 1964)
 June 18 
 Grand Duchess Anastasia of Russia (d. 1918)
 Denis Johnston, Irish playwright (d. 1984)
 June 20 – Princess Nina Georgievna of Russia (d. 1974)
 June 23
 Richard Ripley, British athlete (d. 1996) 
 Chuck Taylor, American basketball player, salesman (d. 1969)
 June 24 
 Marcel Mule, French saxophonist (d. 2001)
 Harry Partch, American composer (d. 1974)
 June 25 – Giovanni Barbini, Italian naval officer (d. 1998)
 June 26 – Stuart Symington, American politician (d. 1988)
 June 27 – Merle Tuve, American physicist (d. 1982) 
 June 29 – Nelson Eddy, American singer, actor (d. 1967)

July 
 July 1 – Tom Gorman, Australian rugby league footballer (d. 1978)
 July 4 – Curtis Shears, American fencer (d. 1988)
 July 7
 Seán Clancy, oldest Irish War of Independence veteran (d. 2006)
 Vittorio De Sica, Italian actor and film director (d. 1974)
 Gustav Knuth, German film actor (d. 1987)
 Eiji Tsuburaya, Japanese film director and special effects designer (d. 1970)
 July 9 
 Barbara Cartland, English novelist (d. 2000)
 Frank Finnigan, Canadian ice hockey player (d. 1991)
 Lou Polli, Italian baseball pitcher (d. 2000)
 July 10 – Daniel V. Gallery, American admiral and author (d. 1977)
 July 13 – Eric Portman, English actor (d. 1969)
 July 14 – Lucien Prival, American actor (d. 1994)
 July 17 – Bruno Jasieński, Polish poet (d. 1938)
 July 20 – Heinie Manush, American baseball player (d. 1971)
 July 21 
Sue Wah Chin, Australian entrepreneur (d. 2000)
 Albert Hamilton Gordon, American businessman and philanthropist (d. 2009)
 July 24
Mabel Albertson, American actress (d. 1982)
Igor Ilyinsky, Soviet and Russian actor, comedian and director (d. 1987)
 July 28 – Rudy Vallée, American actor and jazz musician (d. 1986)
 July 31 – Jean Dubuffet, French painter (d. 1985)

August 

 August 1 – Pancho Villa, Filipino boxer (d. 1925)
 August 4 – Louis Armstrong, American jazz musician (d. 1971)
 August 5 – Thomas J. Ryan, American admiral (d. 1970)
 August 8 – Ernest Lawrence, American physicist, Nobel Prize laureate (d. 1958)
 August 10 – Franco Dino Rasetti, Italian scientist (d. 2001)
 August 14 – Alice Rivaz, Swiss writer (d. 1998)
 August 18
Lucienne Boyer, French singer (d. 1983)
 Jean Guitton, French writer and philosopher (d. 1999)
 August 20 – Salvatore Quasimodo, Italian novelist, writer and Nobel Prize laureate (d. 1968)
 August 24 – Edmund Germer, German electrical engineer and inventor (d. 1987)
 August 26
Maxwell D. Taylor, American general (d. 1987)
 Chen Yi, Chinese military commander and politician (d. 1972)
 Jan de Quay, Dutch politician, psychologist and 31st Prime Minister of the Netherlands (d. 1985)
 August 28 – Babe London, American actress and comedian (d. 1980)
 August 30
 John Gunther, American writer (d. 1970)
 Roy Wilkins, American civil rights activist (d. 1981)

September 

 September 2 
 Andreas Embirikos, Greek poet (d. 1975)
 Adolph Rupp, American college basketball coach (d. 1977)
 September 4 – William Lyons, British automobile engineer, designer (d. 1985)
 September 5
 Mario Scelba, 33rd prime minister of Italy (d. 1991)
 Florence Eldridge, American actress (d. 1988)
 September 7 – Abdallah El-Yafi, 7-time prime minister of Lebanon (d. 1986)
 September 8 – Hendrik Verwoerd, 6th prime minister of South Africa (d. 1966)
 September 9 – James Blades, English percussionist (d. 1999)
 September 12
 Ben Blue, Canadian-born comedian, actor (d. 1975)
 Shmuel Horowitz, Russian-born Israeli agronomist (d. 1999)
 September 13 – Claude Dupuy, French Roman Catholic priest and bishop (d. 1989)
 September 14 – Andrey Vlasov, Soviet general, commander of the Russian Liberation Army (d. 1946)
 September 15 – Sir Donald Bailey, British civil engineer (d. 1985)
 September 16 – Andrée Brunet, French pair skater (d. 1993)
 September 17 – Sir Francis Chichester, British sailor (d. 1972)
 September 21 – Learie Constantine, Trinidad-born cricketer and race relations campaigner (d. 1971)
 September 22
 Charles Brenton Huggins, Canadian-born cancer researcher, recipient of the Nobel Prize in Physiology or Medicine (d. 1997)
 Nadezhda Alliluyeva-Stalin, second wife of Joseph Stalin (d. 1932)
 September 23 – Jaroslav Seifert, Czech writer, Nobel Prize laureate (d. 1986)
 September 24 – Gerald Warner Brace, American writer, educator, sailor and boat builder (d. 1978)
 September 25 – Robert Bresson, French film director (d. 1999)
 September 26 – George Raft, American film actor (d. 1980)
 September 28
 Ed Sullivan, American entertainer (d. 1974)
 William S. Paley, American businessman, founder of CBS (d. 1990)
 September 29
 Enrico Fermi, Italian physicist, Nobel Prize laureate (d. 1954)
 Lanza del Vasto, Italian philosopher, poet, and activist (d. 1981)

October 

 October 2 – Alice Prin, French singer (d. 1953)
 October 3 – Jean Grémillon, French film director (d. 1959)
 October 10 – Alberto Giacometti, Swiss sculptor and painter (d. 1966)
 October 17 – Cesare Bettarini, Italian actor (d. 1975)
 October 19 – Arleigh Burke, American admiral (d. 1996)
 October 20
 Evelyn Brent, American actress (d. 1975)
 Adelaide Hall, American jazz singer, entertainer (d. 1993)
 October 22 – Wijeyananda Dahanayake, 5th prime minister of Sri Lanka (d. 1997)
 October 24
 Gilda Gray, Polish-born dancer, actress (d. 1959)
 Moultrie Kelsall, Scottish film, television actor (d. 1980)
 October 28 – Hilo Hattie, native Hawaiian singer, actress (d. 1979)
 October 29 – Ana María Vela Rubio, Spanish supercentenarian (d. 2017)

November 

 November 2 – James Dunn, American actor (d. 1967)
 November 3
 Prithviraj Kapoor, pioneer of Indian Cinema and Indian Theatre (d. 1972)
 Leopold III of Belgium (d. 1983)
 November 4
 Yi Bangja, Crown Princess of Korea (d. 1989)
 Max Wagner, Mexican-born American film actor (d. 1975)
 November 7 – Norah McGuinness, Irish painter, illustrator (d. 1980)
 November 8 – Xu Xiangqian, Communist military leader in the People's Republic of China, former defense minister (d. 1990)
 November 11
Helen Reichert, American broadcaster and educator (d. 2011)
Magda Goebbels, wife of German Propaganda Minister Joseph Goebbels (d. 1945)
 November 13 – Arturo Jauretche, Argentine writer, politician, and philosopher (d. 1974)
 November 17 – Lee Strasberg, Polish-born American actor, acting teacher and co-founder of method acting (d. 1982)
 November 18 – George Gallup, American statistician, opinion pollster (d. 1984)
 November 19 – Nina Bari, Soviet and Russian mathematician (d. 1961)
 November 22
 Lee Patrick, American actress (d. 1982)
 Joaquín Rodrigo, Spanish composer (d. 1999)
 November 25 
Marziyya Davudova, Soviet and Azerbaijani actress (d. 1962)
 Fernando Tambroni, Italian politician, 36th Prime Minister of Italy (d. 1963)
 November 27 – George Scott Register, American judge (d. 1972)
 November 28
Walter Havighurst, American critic, novelist, literary and social historian of the Midwest, professor of English at Miami University (d. 1994)
Roy Urquhart, British general (d. 1988)
 November 29 – Mildred Harris, American actress (d. 1944)

December 

 December 5
 Walt Disney, American animator, film producer (d. 1966)
 Milton Erickson, American psychiatrist (d. 1980)
 Werner Heisenberg, German physicist, Nobel Prize laureate (d. 1976)
 December 7 – Troy Sanders, American film score composer (d. 1959)
 December 8 – Arthur Leslie, British actor (d. 1970)
 December 9 – Jean Mermoz, French aviator (d. 1936)
 December 12 – Fred Barker, American criminal, youngest son of Ma Barker (d. 1935)
 December 16 – Margaret Mead, American cultural anthropologist (d. 1978)
 December 19
 Rudolf Hell, German inventor (d. 2002)
 Vitorino Nemesio, Portuguese poet and author (d. 1978)
 December 25 – Princess Alice, Duchess of Gloucester (d. 2004)
 December 27 – Marlene Dietrich, German-American actress (d. 1992)
 December 31 
 Julia Bathory, Hungarian glass designer (d. 2000)
 Karl-August Fagerholm, Prime Minister of Finland (d. 1984)

Deaths

January–February 

 January 1 – Ignatius L. Donnelly, American politician and writer (b. 1831)
 January 8 – John Barry, Irish recipient of the Victoria Cross (b. 1873)
 January 10 – Sir James Dickson, Premier of Queensland, Australian Minister for Defence (b. 1832)
 January 11 – Vasily Kalinnikov, Russian composer (b. 1866)
 January 14 – Víctor Balaguer, Spanish politician, author (b. 1824)
 January 16
 Arnold Böcklin, Swiss artist (b. 1827)
 Mahadev Govind Ranade, Indian reformer (b. 1842)
 January 17 
 Leonard Fulton Ross, American Civil War general (b. 1823)
 Frederic W. H. Myers, British poet and psychic researcher (b. 1843)
 January 19 – Albert, 4th duc de Broglie, French politician, 28th Prime Minister of France (b. 1821)
 January 21 – Elisha Gray, American inventor, appliance manufacturer (b. 1835)
 January 22 – Queen Victoria of the United Kingdom, Empress of India (b. 1819)
 January 27 – Giuseppe Verdi, Italian composer (b. 1813)
 January 28 – Iosif Gurko, Russian field marshal (b. 1828)
 February 7 – Ana Betancourt, Cuban national heroine (b. 1832) 
 February 10 – Max von Pettenkofer, Bavarian chemist and hygienist (b. 1818)
 February 11
 King Milan I of Serbia (b. 1854)
 Ramón de Campoamor, Spanish poet (b. 1817)
 February 14 – Sir Edward Stafford, Scottish-New Zealand educator, politician and 3rd Prime Minister of New Zealand (b. 1819)
 February 22 – George Francis FitzGerald, Irish mathematician (b. 1851)
 February 26 – Lucyna Ćwierczakiewiczowa, Polish writer (b. 1829)

March–April 
 March 13 – Benjamin Harrison, 23rd President of the United States (b. 1833)
 March 23 – Konstantin Stoilov, 8th Prime Minister of Bulgaria (b. 1853)
 March 31 – Sir John Stainer, British composer and organist (b. 1840)
 April 1 – François-Marie Raoult, French chemist (b. 1830)
 April 3 – Richard D'Oyly Carte, English impresario (b. 1844)
 April 9 – Shrimad Rajchandra, Indian Jain philosopher, scholar and poet, spiritual mentor of Mahatma Gandhi (b. 1867)
 April 24 – Arvid Posse, 2nd prime minister of Sweden (b. 1820)

May–June 
 May 1 – Lewis Waterman, American inventor, businessman (b. 1837)
 May 4 – Fritz Mayer van den Bergh, Belgian art collector and art historian (b. 1858)
 May 5 – Mariano Ignacio Prado, Peruvian general, statesman, and three-time President of Peru (b. 1825)
 May 7 – Dimitar Grekov, 10th Prime Minister of Bulgaria (b. 1847)
 May 19 – Marthinus Wessel Pretorius, 1st President of South Africa (b. 1819)
 May 21 – Sir John Commerell, British admiral of the fleet (b. 1829)
 May 22 – Gaetano Bresci, Italian anarchist and assassin (b. 1869)
 May 24 – Charlotte Mary Yonge, English novelist (b. 1823)
 May 31 – Ernest de Sarzec, French archeologist (b. 1832)
 June 2 – George Leslie Mackay, Canadian missionary (b. 1844)
 June 4 – Charlotte Fowler Wells, American phrenologist (b. 1814)
 June 9
 Walter Besant, English writer (b. 1836)
 Adolf Bötticher, German art historian (b. 1842)
 June 13 – Leopoldo Alas, 'Clarín', Spanish novelist (b. 1852)
 June 16 – Herman Grimm, German historian (b. 1828)
 June 21 – Anthony Hoskins, British admiral (b. 1828)
 June 25 – Alexandru Candiano-Popescu, Romanian general, lawyer, journalist, and poet (b. 1841)

July–August 

 July 4
 John Fiske, American philosopher (b. 1842)
 Johannes Schmidt, German linguist (b. 1843)
 July 6 
 Chlodwig, Prince of Hohenlohe-Schillingsfürst, Chancellor of Germany (b. 1819)
 Joseph LeConte, American physician and geologist (b. 1823)
 July 7 – Johanna Spyri, Swiss writer (b. 1827)
 July 10 – Kliment of Tarnovo, 2nd Prime Minister of Bulgaria (b. 1841)
 July 11 – Marietta Bones, American suffragist, social reformer, philanthropist (b. 1842)
 July 18 – Jan ten Brink, Dutch writer (b. 1834)
 August 5 – Victoria, Princess Royal (b. 1840)
 August 12
 Francesco Crispi, 11th Prime Minister of Italy (b. 1819)
 Adolf Erik Nordenskiöld, Finnish-Swedish botanist, geologist, mineralogist, and explorer (b. 1832)
 August 19 – Shō Tai, last king of the Ryūkyū Kingdom in Japan (b. 1843)
 August 21 – Adolf Eugen Fick, German-born physician and physiologist (b. 1829)

September–October 

 September 9 – Henri de Toulouse-Lautrec, French painter (b. 1864)
 September 10 – Emanuella Carlbeck, Swedish educator and social reformer (b. 1829) 
 September 14 – William McKinley, 25th President of the United States (assassinated) (b. 1843)
 September 15 – Sir Joseph Palmer Abbott, Australian politician and solicitor (b. 1842)
 September 25 – Sir Arthur Fremantle, British army general (b. 1835)
 October 1 – Abdur Rahman Khan, Emir of Afghanistan (b. 1844)
 October 15 – Carlos María Fitz-James Stuart, 16th Duke of Alba, Spanish aristocrat (b. 1849)
 October 19 – Carl Frederik Tietgen, Danish financier, industrialist (b. 1829)
 October 28 – Paul Rée, German author and philosopher (b. 1849)
 October 29 
 Leon Czolgosz, Polish-American assassin of U.S. President William McKinley (executed) (b. 1873)
 John Kemp Starley, English bicycle inventor (b. 1854)

November–December 
 November 7 – Li Hongzhang, Chinese general (b. 1823)
 November 13 – Sir William Stewart, British admiral (b. 1822)
 November 27 – Clement Studebaker, American manufacturer (b. 1831)
 November 29 – Francisco Pi y Margall, Spanish politician, former president of the Republic (b. 1824)
 November 30 – Edward John Eyre, English explorer, Governor of Jamaica (b. 1815)
 December 6 – Bertha Wehnert-Beckmann, German photographer (b. 1815) 
 December 11 – Lev Ivanov, Russian choreographer (b. 1834)

Nobel Prizes 

 Physics – Wilhelm Conrad Röntgen
 Chemistry – Jacobus Henricus van 't Hoff
 Medicine – Emil Adolf von Behring
 Literature – Sully Prudhomme
 Peace – Jean Henri Dunant and Frédéric Passy

Significance of 1901 for modern computers 

The date of Friday December 13 20:45:52 1901 is significant for modern computers because it is the earliest date representable with a signed 32-bit integer on systems that reference time in seconds since the Unix epoch. This corresponds to -2147483648 seconds from Thursday January 1 00:00:00 1970. For the same reason, many computers are also unable to represent an earlier date. For related reasons, many computer systems suffer from the Year 2038 problem. This is when the positive number of seconds since 1970 exceeds 2147483647 (01111111 11111111 11111111 11111111 in binary) and wraps to -2147483648. Hence the computer system erroneously displays or operates on the time Friday December 13 20:45:52 1901. In this way, the year 1900 is to the Year 2000 problem as the year 1901 is to the Year 2038 problem.

References

Further reading
 
 Gilbert, Martin. A History of the Twentieth Century: vol. 1 1900–1933 (1997) pp 36–54; Global coverage of politics, diplomacy etc.